Melanie Whelan is an American businesswoman who currently serves as a managing director of the investment firm Summit Partners.

Whelan began her career working in corporate development for Virgin America and Starwood. She later became vice president of business development for Equinox Fitness. Whelan served as the COO of SoulCycle from 2012 until 2015, when she became the company's CEO. She led the company's initial public offering (IPO). In 2020, Whelan joined investment firm Summit Partners as a managing director.

References

External links
 Melanie Whelan of SoulCycle: Find the Questions in Every Answer
 How I became a CEO: Melanie Whelan of SoulCycle
 SoulCycle CEO tries to keep politics out of the studio

Living people
Brown University alumni
Businesspeople from Baltimore
21st-century American businesspeople
Bryn Mawr School people
Henry Crown Fellows
Year of birth missing (living people)